The deployment of a mechanical device, electrical system, computer program, etc., is its assembly or transformation from a packaged form to an operational working state.

Deployment implies moving a product from a temporary or development state to a permanent or desired state.

See also 
 IT infrastructure deployment
 Development
 Innovation
 Software deployment

References

Systems engineering